Hallendrup is a small village in Favrskov Municipality in Denmark. There's a small village of the same name 36 km to the east in Norddjurs Municipality.

Villages in Denmark
Populated places in Central Denmark Region
Favrskov Municipality